Estádio Lindolfo Monteiro is a stadium in Teresina, Brazil. It has a capacity of 15,269 spectators.

References

Lindolfinho
Sports venues completed in 1944